The Park Hotel is a historic building located in Sac City, Iowa, United States. The three-story, brick structure was designed by the Storm Lake, Iowa architectural firm of Unger and Parks and built by Parks Construction, also of Storm Lake. The building was completed in 1912 and enlarged in 1917. Prior to its construction, Sac City had several food and lodging establishments, but it lacked a quality hotel. The present building was built next to a wood-frame Park Hotel that was built in 1860. Sac City’s Commercial Club was instrumental in raising the capital to build the new Park Hotel. D. M. Farmer, who owned the old hotel, took ownership of the new one as well, and paid off the Commercial Club. He managed the hotel until 1920 when Edwin Boss of the Boss Hotel group took over for eight years. The Farmer family, however, maintained ownership of the hotel until 1962. The building remained a hotel until 1980 when Marie Ramstad bought it for her home and music studio. She died in 2016 and her daughters took ownership of the building. It was listed on the National Register of Historic Places in 2017.

References

Hotel buildings completed in 1912
Sac City, Iowa
Buildings and structures in Sac County, Iowa
National Register of Historic Places in Sac County, Iowa
Hotel buildings on the National Register of Historic Places in Iowa
Former railway stations in Iowa